is a Japanese manga series by Kirie. It has been serialized online via Flex Comix's Comic Meteor website since December 2020 and has been collected in four tankōbon volumes as of March 2023.

Plot
Izumi Irie is summoned to another world as a hero, where he joins forces with Sheena, a high-level mage. Sheena develops romantic feelings for Irie, and, not wanting Irie to be returned to his original world once they defeat the Demon King, wears revealing outfits to distract him during battles.

Publication
Written and illustrated by Kirie, The White Mage Doesn't Want to Raise the Hero's Level began as a one-shot published in Flex Comix's Comic Meteor website on 11 March 2020. It later became a full series on 16 December 2020. The first volume was released on 6 August 2021. The series has been collected in four volumes of 10 March 2023. The series has been licensed by Seven Seas Entertainment for English publication.

Volume list

References

External links
  
 

Comic Meteor manga
Isekai anime and manga
Japanese webcomics
Romantic comedy anime and manga
Seinen manga
Seven Seas Entertainment titles
Sword and sorcery anime and manga
Webcomics in print